Elizabeth: A Portrait in Parts, released as Elizabeth: A Portrait in Part(s) in some territories, is a 2022 documentary film about Queen Elizabeth II. The film was directed by Roger Michell. It is the final film by Michell before his death.

References

External links
 

2022 documentary films
Films directed by Roger Michell
Films scored by George Fenton
2020s English-language films
British documentary films
2020s British films